Alf Konningen (26 June 1901 – 27 January 1978) was a Norwegian alpine skier who competed in the 1936 Winter Olympics.

In 1936 he finished eighth in the alpine skiing combined event.

Born in Kongsberg, he represented Kongsberg IF.

External links
 Alpine skiing 1936 

1901 births
1978 deaths
Norwegian male alpine skiers
Olympic alpine skiers of Norway
Alpine skiers at the 1936 Winter Olympics
People from Kongsberg
Kongsberg IF
Sportspeople from Viken (county)